is a large trans-Neptunian object from the outermost region of the Solar System, currently 62.87 AUs from the sun, with a 61.7 AU semimajor axis.

See also 
List of Solar System objects most distant from the Sun

References

External links 
 

Trans-Neptunian objects
Minor planet object articles (unnumbered)